Arsen Anton Ostojić (born 29 July 1965) is a Croatian film director and screenwriter.

He won the Golden Arena for Best Director at the 2008 Pula Film Festival, and was nominated for the European Discovery of the Year award at the 2004 European Film Awards.

Filmography
A Wonderful Night in Split (Ta divna splitska noć, 2004)
No One's Son (Ničiji sin, 2008)
Halima's Path (Halimin put, 2012)
Man in the Box (2015), production stage
F20 (2018)

References

External links

1965 births
Living people
Film people from Split, Croatia
Croatian film directors
Croatian screenwriters
Golden Arena for Best Director winners
Vladimir Nazor Award winners